Astrothelium disjunctum is a species of corticolous (bark-dwelling), crustose lichen in the family Trypetheliaceae. Found in Brazil, it was formally described as a new species in 2016 by lichenologists André Aptroot and Marcela Cáceres. The type specimen was collected by the authors in the Parque Natural Municipal de Porto Velho (Porto Velho, Rondônia), in a low-altitude rainforest. The characteristic that largely distinguishes it from other members of Astrothelium are its smooth to coarsely uneven thallus. Astrothelium disjunctum is somewhat similar to A. bicolor, but that species has smaller ascospores.

References

disjunctum
Lichen species
Lichens described in 2016
Taxa named by André Aptroot
Taxa named by Marcela Cáceres
Lichens of North Brazil